Khabarovsk Novy Airport  is an airport located at the eastern part of Khabarovsk, Khabarovsk Krai, Russia. Khabarovsk Novy Airport was the main hub for the Russian airline Dalavia, which was shut down by the government due to large debts. Vladivostok Air replaced the role of Dalavia, and Khabarovsk was "upgraded" into a secondary hub for Vladivostok Air. Vladivostok Air was later merged into Aurora.

In 2015, Khabarovsk Novy International Airport carried 1,821,694 passengers.

A small airfield is adjacent to the west side of Khabarovsk Novy, and is known as Khabarovsk MVL (малых воздушных линий, literally "Small Airlines"). It handles charter and general aviation operations, and has a runway length of 960 m (3150 ft).

History
By 1931, hydroports in the area were not enough to serve the growing demand for air travel, and there was a need to find a place to build a new airport. The first airport in the current location was opened in 1938. The year 1953 saw the commissioning of a runway with artificial turf with size of 2,500 × 80m. On 21 March 1954, a terminal with a capacity of 400 passengers per hour was put into operations. In 1964, a new, larger terminal was built.

In 1970, the airport was given international status and completed its first charter international flight Khabarovsk–Osaka (Japan): On board were the participants of the international exhibition Expo '70.

During 1991, Alaska Airlines began flights from the United States, using Boeing 727 jets for passenger flights between Khabarovsk and Ted Stevens International Airport in Anchorage, Alaska. These flights stopped at Magadan, Russia.

New terminal construction and further expansion
In 2016, the old, abandoned terminal was demolished, and on its site, the construction of a new terminal commenced. The new terminal is planned to be equipped with new air-bridges and escalators and will be integrated with the current Soviet-built terminal, which will be re-constructed after the new one commences operations. The new terminal is planned to serve domestic flights.

The new terminal construction is planned to be finished by the end of 2019.

Airlines and destinations

Passenger

Cargo

Statistics

See also

List of the busiest airports in Russia
List of the busiest airports in the former USSR

References

 Airport Khabarovsk (Novy) Aviateka.Handbook

External links
 

Airports in Khabarovsk Krai